Doctor Who: The Music II is a 1985 BBC Records album which is a sequel to Doctor Who: The Music released in 1983. Once again, it featured a selection of BBC Radiophonic Workshop music from the popular series. The compilation was made up of material recorded since its predecessor, including music from Workshop newcomer Jonathan Gibbs. As with the first album, the music was reassembled into short suites and remixed into stereo with added sound effects. It was re-released in 1992 on Silva Screen, with bonus tracks, as The Five Doctors - Classic Music From The BBC Radiophonic Workshop Volume 2. Selections from both Doctor Who - The Music albums were also re-used on the 1994 Silva Screen compilation The Best Of Doctor Who Volume 1 - The Five Doctors.

Track listing

Original 1985 track listing

1992 The Five Doctors track listing

External links
mb21 Discography entry
Album information

BBC Radiophonic Workshop albums
Music II
1985 compilation albums
BBC Records compilation albums
BBC Records soundtracks
Silva Screen Records soundtracks
Silva Screen Records compilation albums
Soundtrack compilation albums